

The RTAF-4 Chanthra was a single-engine two-seat, single-engined primary trainer aircraft built by the Royal Thai Air Force's Science and Weapon Systems Development Centre.

Design and development
The RTAF-4 was developed from the de Havilland Canada DHC-1 Chipmunk that were used by the Royal Thai Air Force. Production began in February 1971 and the prototype made its first flight on 25 September 1972. The plane, with redesigned cockpit and tail sections, had a payload of 345 kg and its maximum gross weight for aerobatics was 1,044 kg. 12 aircraft were produced, that entered into service in 1974, four of which were used as trainers for the Civil Aviation Department of the Thai Air Force.

One unit has been preserved at the Royal Thai Air Force Museum, Don Mueang, Bangkok.

Operators

 Royal Thai Air Force

Aircraft on display
Royal Thai Air Force Museum near Bangkok. Serial BF 03  ( บ.ฝ. ๑๗ ).

Specifications

See also

References

External links

Aircraft Production in Thailand
History of The Royal Thai Air Force - Royal Thai Air Force Aircraft Designations

Aircraft manufactured in Thailand
Single-engined tractor aircraft
Low-wing aircraft
1970s Thai military trainer aircraft
Aircraft first flown in 1972